is a passenger railway station on the Saikyō Line located in Minami-ku, Saitama, Saitama Prefecture, Japan, operated by the East Japan Railway Company (JR East).

Lines
Some trains continue northward to  via the Kawagoe Line and southward to  via the TWR Rinkai Line. The station is located 17.3 km from Ikebukuro Station. The station identification colour is "canary yellow".

Station layout

The station consists of one elevated island platform serving two tracks. The tracks of the Tōhoku Shinkansen also run adjacent to this station, on the west side. The station is staffed.

Platforms

History
The station opened on 30 September 1985.

Passenger statistics
In fiscal 2019, the station was used by an average of 13,537 passengers daily (boarding passengers only).

The passenger figures for previous years are as shown below.

Surrounding area
 Saitama Prefectural Government Office
 Saitama City Office
 Saitama Urawa Ward Office

See also
List of railway stations in Japan

References

External links

 Naka-Urawa Station information (JR East) 

Railway stations in Saitama Prefecture
Saikyō Line
Stations of East Japan Railway Company
Railway stations in Saitama (city)
Railway stations in Japan opened in 1985